Wing Commander Antoni (Toni) Głowacki (10 February 1910 – 27 April 1980) DFC, DFM, was a Polish Second World War fighter pilot flying with Polish Squadrons attached to the Royal Air Force, who is notable for shooting down five German aircraft on 24 August 1940 during the Battle of Britain, becoming one of only four pilots who gained "ace-in-a-day" status during that battle, the others being New Zealander Brian Carbury, Englishman Ronald Hamlyn and Scot Archie McKellar.

Early years
Głowacki was born on 10 February 1910 in Warsaw, attending a local primary school and graduating from the Radio Engineering School. He attended the Wawelberg and Rotwand Advanced Constructing and Electronics School, a technical school and between 1928 and 1930 he was the head of the laboratory in the Philips plants in Poland.

After enrolling in basic military training, Głowacki entered air training at Lublinek airfield near Lodz. After 1935, he became an officer serving in 1 Air Wing in Warsaw. In 1938, Głowacki completed a specialist course at the Air Force Training Centre No.1 in Dęblin, and was retained there as a flying instructor, as the Polish Air Force was in great need of new recruits. He joined other instructors such as Jan Zumbach and Janusz Żurakowski.

Second World War
During  "Black September", (September 1939), the Dęblin unit was unable to mount a defence and Głowacki joined a reconnaissance platoon of the Warsaw Armoured-Motorised Brigade, commanded by Flight Lieutenant Julian Lagowski. At the collapse of the Polish resistance in late September, Głowacki fled to Romania where along with thousands of other Polish soldiers and airmen, he was interned. He made his way to France via the sea, as the Battle of France was imminent, and was ordered to join the first 100 pilots selected to train as a bomber pilot in England. On arrival in England on 28 January 1940, they were transferred by the RAF to fighter squadrons which were rapidly being deployed in anticipation of an attack on Britain in 1940.

After initial training at No. 6 OTU in Sutton Bridge, Głowacki was posted to No. 501 RAF "County of Gloucester" Fighter Squadron on 5 August 1940 as a sergeant pilot flying Hawker Hurricanes.

Battle of Britain
Głowacki was immediately involved in uneventful daily sorties for 10 days (building up his total flying time on Hurricanes to 50 hours), until 15 July when the squadron intercepted Junkers Ju 87 dive-bombers. His first combat sorties in Hurricane I, SD-A (VZ124) resulted in a Ju 87 and later in the same day, a Dornier Do 215 destroyed. His squadron was deployed four times throughout the day, intercepting raiders over Dover.

Unlike other RAF pilots, Głowacki preferred to fly one aircraft exclusively, SD-A (V7234), which he considered his "lucky Hurricane." During three sorties on 24 August 1940, flying SD-A, Głowacki shot down three Bf 109s and two Junkers Ju 88 bombers over Ramsgate, to become the first "One-day Ace" of the Battle of Britain.

On 28 August 1940 Głowacki shot down another Bf 109 when flying SD-O (P5193). On 31 August 1940, during an attack on group of Dornier Do 17 bombers, he claimed a bomber that dived out of the formation (although the claim was later reverted to a probable), but he was shot down over Gravesend and was injured when his Hurricane SD-P (P3208) crashed and was burnt out. After returning from hospital, he was again rotated into regular duty, but had a difficult time regaining his scoring touch. Głowacki was promoted to Pilot Officer and on 10 February 1941 was posted to No. 55 OTU at Usworth, where he was a flying instructor specialising in combat tactics.

European Theatre
On 7 November 1941, along with other Poles who had been attached to RAF squadrons, Głowacki was transferred to No. 303 Polish Fighter Squadron where he eventually flew Supermarine Spitfires. On 27 April and 19 August 1942, Głowacki had two probables over Dieppe, claiming Focke-Wulf Fw 190s. He also shared in the downing of a Heinkel He 111.

On 7 February 1943 Squadron Leader Głowacki was transferred to No. 308 "City of Kraków" Polish Fighter Squadron (Krakowski), serving as flight commander until 22 February 1944. After an exchange posting with the USAAF in May 1944, he was posted to No. 61 OTU. From 9 September 1944 till 16 July 1945, Głowacki was the commanding officer at No. 309 "Land of Czerwień" Polish Fighter-Reconnaissance Squadron (Ziemi Czerwieńskiej). The squadron was equipped with long-ranging North American Mustang Mk III fighters. From 23 July 1945 he served in No. 60 OTU and between October and November 1945 he served in No. 307 "City of Lwów" Polish Night Fighter Squadron (Lwowskich Puchaczy).

Postwar
From 1 December 1945 Głowacki was a liaison officer to 13 RAF Fighter Group. At the end of 1946, Głowacki was the commanding officer of No. 302 "City of Poznań" Polish Fighter Squadron (Poznański). His last rank in the Royal Air Force was Squadron Leader. Głowacki's wartime victories involved a number of disputes but he is credited with eight victories, one shared, three probable and three damaged. After the war, he completed his memoirs which detailed his combat missions.

After demobilisation, Głowacki emigrated to New Zealand where he joined the Royal New Zealand Air Force. As a Flight Lieutenant he was an instructor at OTU at Ohakea Air Base, converting new pilots from piston-engined trainers to Vampire jets. He retired from the RNZAF in 1960 and became an airfield inspector with the New Zealand Department of Civil Aviation where he was responsible for sport and executive aviation. Głowacki died on 27 April 1980 in Wellington, New Zealand.

Honours and tributes
In recognition of his service in the Battle of Britain and later campaigns, Głowacki received several awards:
 Distinguished Flying Medal
 Silver Cross of the Virtuti Militari (War Order No. 08814, 23 December 1940)
 Cross of Valour (Poland) and three bars
 Distinguished Flying Cross (United Kingdom) (15 November 1942)

See also

 List of RAF aircrew in the Battle of Britain
 Non-British personnel in the RAF during the Battle of Britain

References
Notes

Bibliography

 Fiedler, Arkady. Dywizjon 303 (in Polish). London, Roy, 1942. (Translated as Squadron 303: The Polish Fighter Squadron with the R.A.F.. London: Peter Davies Ltd., 1942./New York: Roy Publishers, 1943. New edition Kessinger Publishing, 2007.)
 Gretzyngier, Robert. Poles in Defence of Britain: A Day-by-Day Chronology of Polish Day and Night Fighter Operations, July 1940 – June 1941. London: Grub Street, 2001. .
 Tadeusz Jerzy Krzystek, Anna Krzystek: Polskie Siły Powietrzne w Wielkiej Brytanii w latach 1940-1947 łącznie z Pomocniczą Lotniczą Służbą Kobiet (PLSK-WAAF). Sandomierz: Stratus, 2012, p. 197. 
 Lisiewicz, Mieczyslaw (Translated from the Polish by Ann Maitland-Chuwen). Destiny Can Wait: The Polish Air Force in the Second World War. London: Heinemann, 1949.

 Piotr Sikora: Asy polskiego lotnictwa. Warszawa: Oficyna Wydawnicza Alma-Press. 2014, p. 250-255. 
 Józef Zieliński: Asy polskiego lotnictwa. Warszawa: Agencja lotnicza ALTAIR, 1994, p. 36. ISBN 83862172. 
 Józef Zieliński: Lotnicy polscy w Bitwie o Wielką Brytanię. Warszawa: Oficyna Wydawnicza MH, 2005, pp. 56-57.

External links
 W/Cdr Glowacki Antoni

1980 deaths
1910 births
The Few
Recipients of the Distinguished Flying Cross (United Kingdom)
Recipients of the Distinguished Flying Medal
Polish Royal Air Force pilots of World War II
Polish World War II flying aces
Royal Air Force wing commanders
Royal New Zealand Air Force personnel
Recipients of the Silver Cross of the Virtuti Militari
Recipients of the Cross of Valour (Poland)
Royal Air Force pilots of World War II
Polish emigrants to New Zealand